The Golden Globe Award for Best Actor in a Motion Picture – Drama is a Golden Globe Award that was first awarded by the Hollywood Foreign Press Association as a separate category in 1951. Previously, there was a single award for "Best Actor in a Motion Picture" but the splitting allowed for recognition of it and the Best Actor – Musical or Comedy.

The formal title has varied since its inception. In 2005, it was officially called: "Best Performance by an Actor in a Motion Picture – Drama". , the wording is "Best Actor in a Motion Picture – Drama".

Winners and nominees

1940s

1950s

1960s

1970s

1980s

1990s

2000s

2010s

2020s

Multiple nominations

10 nominations
 Al Pacino

9 nominations
 Denzel Washington

8 nominations
 Leonardo DiCaprio
 Jack Nicholson

7 nominations
 Daniel Day-Lewis
 Paul Newman

6 nominations
 Tom Hanks
 Jack Lemmon

5 nominations
 Richard Burton
 Russell Crowe
 Gene Hackman
 Dustin Hoffman
 Anthony Hopkins
 Peter O'Toole
 Gregory Peck
 Sidney Poitier
 Jon Voight

4 nominations
 Warren Beatty
 Marlon Brando
 Robert De Niro
 Burt Lancaster
 Will Smith
 Spencer Tracy

3 nominations
 Javier Bardem
 Michael Caine
 George Clooney
 Tom Cruise
 Albert Finney
 Harrison Ford
 Fredric March
 Steve McQueen
 Liam Neeson
 Nick Nolte
 Laurence Olivier
 Sean Penn
 Brad Pitt
 George C. Scott

2 nominations
 Alan Arkin
 Alan Bates
 Jeff Bridges
 Gary Cooper
 Kevin Costner
 Benedict Cumberbatch
 Tony Curtis
 Matt Damon
 Kirk Douglas
 Michael Douglas
 Richard Farnsworth
 Michael Fassbender
 Peter Finch
 Colin Firth
 Henry Fonda
 Morgan Freeman
 Richard Gere
 Ryan Gosling
 Rex Harrison
 Charlton Heston
 Tom Hulce
 William Hurt
 Jeremy Irons
 Ben Kingsley
 Ian McKellen
 Ray Milland
 Viggo Mortensen
 Joaquin Phoenix
 Gary Oldman
 Anthony Quinn
 Eddie Redmayne
 Geoffrey Rush
 Maximilian Schell
 Kevin Spacey
 Rod Steiger
 Forest Whitaker
 Robin Williams

Multiple wins

3 wins
 Tom Hanks (2 consecutive)
 Jack Nicholson (2 consecutive)

2 wins
 Marlon Brando
 Daniel Day-Lewis
 Leonardo DiCaprio
 Dustin Hoffman
 Peter O'Toole
 Al Pacino
 Gregory Peck
 Jon Voight

See also
 Academy Award for Best Actor
 Critics' Choice Movie Award for Best Actor
 Independent Spirit Award for Best Male Lead
 BAFTA Award for Best Actor in a Leading Role
 Golden Globe Award for Best Actor – Motion Picture Musical or Comedy
 Screen Actors Guild Award for Outstanding Performance by a Male Actor in a Leading Role

References

Golden Globe Awards
 
Film awards for lead actor